Coleophora verbljushkella is a moth of the family Coleophoridae. It is found in the southern Ural Mountains in Russia.

References

verbljushkella
Moths of Europe
Moths described in 2007